Finnegan is an unincorporated community in southern Alberta in Special Area No. 2, located  west of Highway 36,  northwest of Brooks.

Finnegan Ferry
The Finnegan Ferry is a historic cable ferry in Alberta, Canada that is still in operation.  It is located at the unincorporated community of Finnegan. The ferry is the North/South connection of Alberta Highway 862 where it crosses the Red Deer River.

It is named for John Finnegan (1842–1924) who homesteaded on the river, then opened and operated the ferry.  The community is named after the ferry. According to a tourism guidebook, Finnegan "was a very active wirey man all his life and at the age of 75 could still do handsprings!"

The toll-free ferry is operated by Alberta Transportation. It has a capacity of thirteen cars, or fifty passengers. The ferry operates between 7:00 am and midnight from April 20 until November 15.

In popular culture
In 1991, musician Tom Cochrane shot part of the music video to his song "Life Is a Highway" on the ferry.

References

External links
360 degree view photo of the ferry, from 2003

Localities in Special Area No. 2